Adriana Louvier Vargas (born September 18, 1983), known artistically as Adriana Louvier, is a Mexican television actress and presenter.

Life

Louvier began acting as a lead actress with a television screen debut in La mujer de Lorenzo (2003), followed by roles in Amor en custodia (2005). She participated in Emperatriz (2011), Corona de lágrimas (2012) and Quiero amarte (2013). Her most important roles have been in Yo no creo en los hombres (2014), Sin rastro de ti (2016), and her most recent telenovela Caer en tentación (2017).

Filmography

Films

Television

Awards and nominations

Premios TVyNovelas

Festival Pantalla de cristal (México)

References

External links

1980 births
Living people
Mexican telenovela actresses
Mexican television actresses
Mexican film actresses
Mexican stage actresses
Mexican television presenters
21st-century Mexican actresses
Actresses from Mexico City
People educated at Centro de Estudios y Formación Actoral
Mexican people of French descent
People from Mexico City
Mexican women television presenters